William Oloonkishu Yiampoy (born 17 May 1974, in Emarti) is a Kenyan runner who specializes in the 800 metres. His personal best is 1:42.91 minutes, achieved in September 2002 in Rieti.

He graduated from Sosio High School in Kilgoris in 1989. He was recruited by Kenya Police in 1991. He did not start running until 1996. In 1999 he ran his first European races. He was selected to compete at the 2000 Olympics replacing Patrick Konchellah, the winner of Kenyan Olympic trials.

He was part of the 4 x 800 metres relay team who currently holds the world record.

He is married with two children. He is managed by Gianni Demadonna and coached by Gianni Ghidini.  Yiampoy is a member of the Maasai tribe.

Achievements

References

External links

IAAF, September 14, 2004: Focus on Africa - William Oloonkishu Yiampoy , (KEN)

1974 births
Living people
Kenyan male middle-distance runners
Athletes (track and field) at the 2000 Summer Olympics
Olympic athletes of Kenya
World Athletics Championships medalists
World Athletics record holders (relay)
World Athletics Championships athletes for Kenya
Goodwill Games medalists in athletics
People from Narok County
Competitors at the 2001 Goodwill Games
Goodwill Games gold medalists in athletics